Alice Henderson may refer to:

Alice Corbin Henderson (1881–1949), American poet
Alice Henderson (novelist), American novelist
Alice Wonder Land (born Alice Henderson), American pop singer